The women's long jump event at the 2011 All-Africa Games was held on 14 September.

Results

References
Results
Results

Long
2011 in women's athletics